Harris 'Madze' Bulunga is a Eswatini professional football manager.

Career
In November 2013 he became the new caretaker coach of the Swaziland national football team. Since 2014 he is a head coach of the Eswatini national football team.

References

External links

Profile at Soccerpunter.com

Year of birth missing (living people)
Living people
Swazi football managers
Eswatini national football team managers
Place of birth missing (living people)